Buccieri,  Bucchieri is a surname. Notable people with the surname include:

Fiore Buccieri (1907–1973), American mobster
Frank Buccieri (1919–2004), American mobster
Giovanni Bucchieri, Swedish choreographer

See also

Occupational surnames